John Grattan may refer to:
 John Lawrence Grattan, US Cavalry officer whose poor judgement and inexperience led to the Grattan massacre
 John Grattan (naturalist), Irish naturalist and anthropologist